

289001–289100 

|-id=020
| 289020 Ukmerge ||  || Ukmerge, a city with 22 000 inhabitants in Vilnius County, Lithuania, located 78 km north-west of Vilnius. || 
|-id=021
| 289021 Juzeliunas ||  || Gediminas Juzeliūnas (born 1958), a Lithuanian theoretical physicist and head of the Quantum optics group at Vilnius University, who is known for his discoveries related to the properties of ultracold atoms. The object is also named in memory of his father Julius Juzeliūnas (1916–2001). || 
|-id=085
| 289085 Andreweil ||  || André Weil (1906–1998), a French mathematician and founder of the Bourbaki group, known for his work in number theory and algebraic geometry || 
|}

289101–289200 

|-id=116
| 289116 Zurbuchen ||  || Thomas Zurbuchen (born 1968), a Swiss-American space scientist and Associate Administrator for the Science Mission Directorate at NASA. || 
|-id=121
| 289121 Druskininkai ||  || Druskininkai is a spa town, with a population of 23 000, on the Nemunas River in southern Lithuania. || 
|}

289201–289300 

|-bgcolor=#f2f2f2
| colspan=4 align=center | 
|}

289301–289400 

|-id=314
| 289314 Chisholm ||  || Eric Chisholm (born 1975), an engineering physicist and manager of the interpretive facility in Victoria || 
|}

289401–289500 

|-bgcolor=#f2f2f2
| colspan=4 align=center | 
|}

289501–289600 

|-id=586
| 289586 Shackleton ||  || Ernest Shackleton (1874–1922), an Anglo-Irish explorer who led three British expeditions to the Antarctic including the Nimrod Expedition and the Shackleton–Rowett Expedition || 
|-id=587
| 289587 Chantdugros ||  || Le Chant du Gros, an open-air music festival founded by Gilles Pierre in 1991 and held in Le Noirmont, Switzerland || 
|}

289601–289700 

|-id=608
| 289608 Wanli ||  || Mari Furukawa (born 1973), known as "Wanli", a Japanese painter || 
|}

289701–289800 

|-bgcolor=#f2f2f2
| colspan=4 align=center | 
|}

289801–289900 

|-bgcolor=#f2f2f2
| colspan=4 align=center | 
|}

289901–290000 

|-id=992
| 289992 Onfray ||  || Michel Onfray (born 1959), a French philosopher and founder of the tuition-free Popular University of Caen || 
|}

References 

289001-290000